Green Cross may refer to:

Science
 Green Cross (chemical warfare), a group of World War I chemical warfare agents

Businesses 
 Green Cross (South Korea), a South Korean pharmaceutical company
 Green Cross (Japan), a Japanese pharmaceutical company

Health and safety 
 Green Cross Code, a traffic safety education program in the United Kingdom
 Green Cross Corps, an alternative name for the British Women's Reserve Ambulance Corps
 Green Cross flags, the industrial safety/health flags in Japan
 Green Cross for Safety Award from the National Safety Council
 Green Cross International, an environmental organization founded by Mikhail Gorbachev
 , a Venezuelan paramedic group

Sports 
 C.A. Green Cross, an Ecuadorian football (soccer) club 
 Club de Deportes Green Cross  (1916–1985), a former Chilean football (soccer) club

See also
 
 Blue Cross (disambiguation)
 Bronze Cross (disambiguation)
 Gold Cross (disambiguation)
 Red Cross (disambiguation)
 Silver Cross (disambiguation)
 White Cross (disambiguation)
 Yellow cross (disambiguation)
 Pharmacy, indicated in some countries by a green cross sign